The 2000 United States Senate election in Wisconsin took place on November 7, 2000. Incumbent Democratic U.S. Senator Herb Kohl won re-election to a third term by a margin of 24.5%.

Major candidates

Democratic 
 Herb Kohl, incumbent U.S. Senator

Republican 
 John Gillespie, founder of Rawhide Boys Ranch
 William Lorge, former State Representative

Results

See also 
 2000 United States Senate elections

References 

Wisconsin
2000
United States Senate election in Wisconsin